Jeffrey R. King is a United States Air Force major general serving as the commander of the Oklahoma City Air Logistics Complex. In February 2021, he was nominated and confirmed for promotion to major general, and was promoted effective July 6, 2021.

References

External links

Year of birth missing (living people)
Living people
Place of birth missing (living people)
United States Air Force generals